Bayswater is a residential and industrial suburb in Melbourne, Victoria, Australia,  east of Melbourne's Central Business District, located within the City of Knox local government area. Bayswater recorded a population of 12,262 at the 2021 census.

History

The first Post Office in the area was Scoresby North, which opened on 8 May 1882 and renamed Macauley in 1884. When the railway arrived in 1889, a Bayswater office near the station replaced Macauley. In 1998 Bayswater Village (at the shopping centre of that name) office replaced Bayswater.

In the late 1940s, a number of German Templers (just released from the Tatura Internment Camp) settled in Bayswater and Boronia. Part of the Temple Society Australia, they built a Community Centre (1961) in Elizabeth Street and a Retirement Village, as well as Nursing Home Tabulam, in partnership with the Australian German Welfare Society (AGWS).

The Bayswater Wine Cellar is the oldest building in the region, erected in the mid 19th century to service loggers that travelled between the city and the Dandenongs. After falling into disarray, it was sold to a developer in late 2017 for 'more than $2 million AUD'.

Current education in Bayswater include Our Lady of Lourdes Primary School, Bayswater Primary School, Bayswater South Primary School, Bayswater West Primary School and Bayswater Secondary College (formerly Bayswater High School).

Its most well-known reserve is Bayswater Park, where football and cricket is played on the two ovals, as well as netball and tennis, on surrounding courts. The adjacent playground, known by the locals as the 'Train Park', contains a disused steam engine, which has been altered for children to play on.

Shopping in Bayswater includes three supermarkets; Woolworths, Aldi and Coles and a  Mitre 10 Home & Trade. The most recent newest shopping precinct is Mountain High Plaza, which was completed in May 2009, and includes an Anytime Fitness 24hr health club, a Coles supermarket, coffee shops and variety stores, including Discount Pharmacy Dimmeys. The Bayswater library is also located within the Mountain High Shopping Centre. Bayswater is also the headquarters of the Knox Opportunity Shop, which is run by Councillors and others.

Bayswater Station is located near Mountain Highway, the main stretch of road running through the suburb and a train ride from Bayswater to the CBD is 29 kilometres.

Bayswater North is located in the City of Maroondah and shares the postcode 3153 with Bayswater.

Bayswater CFA Fire Brigade

On 17 November 1969 Bayswater Fire Brigade was registered with CFA. The Brigade became operational in January 1970 and attended its first fire call on 22 January. However, a site for the Fire Station had not yet been established so the Brigade vehicle was parked under a tarp at the rear of a service station on the corner of Mountain Highway and Highmoor Avenue, Bayswater. On Good Friday 1970 a tin shed was erected to house the Brigade vehicle and other operational equipment.

In 1973 the tin shed was relocated to a site adjacent to the Scoresby Road railway crossing until the present Fire Station was built in 1976.
In 2008, the Brigade leased an additional building on the same site to be used for administration, meetings and indoor training.

Population

Bayswater's census populations have been:

Politics and representation

Bayswater contained three voting booths at the 2010 federal election, all located within the federal electorate of Aston. The seat of Aston is named after Tilly Aston, a blind writer, teacher and advocate for blind people, who was born, raised and lived in Victoria. The suburb is often fairly 'marginal' electorally, in that neither of the main political parties tends to dominate the area. It is therefore a reasonably good barometer in its representation of overall national voting patterns and trends. Historically competitive, the collective 2010 result for the three booths distributed the primary vote in portions of 42.2% to Labor, 41.2% to the Liberals, and 10.8% to the Greens. After the distribution of preferences, the two-party result was 53.8% Labor and 46.2% Liberal.

Liberal MP, Alan Tudge, who ran unsuccessfully for the seat of Aston in 2010, won the seat at the 2013 Australian federal election, 2016 Australian federal election and 2019 Australian federal election.

Schools

Details of Bayswater's schools, past and present, are:

Sport

The suburb has an Australian Rules football team, The Bayswater Kangaroos, known as The Waters, who compete in the Eastern Football League. The suburb is also the home of the Bayswater Cricket Club, of which they are a member of the Victorian Sub District Cricket Association.

References

External links
Australian Places – Bayswater, Victoria
Bayswater Neighborhood on Facebook (login required)
Crusader Hose
Bayswater Volunteer Fire Brigade

Suburbs of Melbourne
Suburbs of the City of Knox